Seyyed Rahimeh (also Romanized as Seyyed Raḩīmeh; also known as Seyyed Raḩmān) is a village in Ahudasht Rural District, Shavur District, Shush County, Khuzestan Province, Iran. At the 2006 census, its population was 616, in 109 families.

References 

Populated places in Shush County